Heidegger, Haidegger and Heidecker are German-language-derived surname.

People bearing the name Heidegger include:
  several people
  (1920–2020), German historian
 Johann Heinrich Heidegger (1633–1698), Swiss theologian
 John James Heidegger, born  (1659–1749), son of Johann Heinrich Heidegger, Swiss-British noble & theatrical entrepreneur, act in London
 Klaus Heidegger (b. 1957), Austrian alpine skier
  (1666–1711), Swiss theologian, author of Mythoscopia Romantica (1698)
 Martin Heidegger (1889–1976), German philosopher, the most famous "Heidegger"
 Max Heidegger (born 1997), American-Israeli basketball player in the Israeli Basketball Premier League

People named Haidegger include:
 Christine Haidegger (1942–2021), an Austrian woman poet and writer
 , born: Christina-Maria Haidegger (1965–1989), Austrian writer, the daughter of Christine
 Charlotte "Lotte" Elisabeth Haidegger (born 1925), Austrian female athlete

Heidecker 
 Tim Heidecker (born 1976), an American actor, comedian, writer and director

References 

Swiss-German surnames
Swiss-language surnames